Aidan Girt is a Canadian drummer for the Montreal-based post-rock collectives Godspeed You! Black Emperor, and Exhaust. He is also a solo electronic artist under the names OSB, 1-Speed Bike, and Bottleskup Flenkenkenmike and continues to record (with others) in Some Became Hollow Tubes.

Career
In 1994, Girt co-founded Godspeed You! Black Emperor.
 
Girt, along with Gordon Krieger and Mike Zabitsky, formed the group Exhaust; they performed in Montreal for a short time and released a single in 1996. In 1998, the three released a self-titled album and, in 2001, a studio album, Enregistreur.

Girt played drums as a guest musician on the debut album of A Silver Mt. Zion in 2000.

As 1-Speed Bike, Girt released a number of solo albums and EPs, including El Gallito in 2004

In 2019 Girt began releasing music as a duo with guitarist Eric Quach under the name Some Became Hollow Tubes.

Discography

Godspeed You! Black Emperor
F♯A♯∞ (Constellation Records, 1997)
Slow Riot for New Zero Kanada (Constellation Records, 1999)
Lift Your Skinny Fists Like Antennas to Heaven (Constellation Records, 2000)
Yanqui U.X.O. (Constellation Records, 2002)
'Allelujah! Don't Bend! Ascend! (Constellation Records, 2012)
Asunder, Sweet and Other Distress (Constellation Records, 2015)
 "Luciferian Towers" (Constellation Records, 2017)
G_d's Pee at State's End! (Constellation Records, 2021)

Exhaust
230596 7" cassette (self-released, 1996)
Exhaust (Constellation Records, 1998)
Enregistreur (Constellation Records, 2002)
Grenadilla Splinters (self-released, 2011)

A Silver Mt. Zion
He Has Left Us Alone but Shafts of Light Sometimes Grace the Corner of Our Rooms... (Constellation Records, 2000)

1-Speed Bike
Droopy Butt Begone! (Constellation Records, 2000)
I'm a Pretzel on a Stealth Mission to Kill the President (Broklyn Beats, 2002)
Limp Penis (self-released, 2003)
El Gallito (Broklyn Beats, 2004)
Klootzak Keizer (Broklyn Beats, 2005)
Someone Told Me Life Gets Easier in Your 50s (Broklyn Beats, 2005)
A Swimmer in the Ocean Is Not Afraid of the Rain (Bully Records, 2006)
Pashto Translator Needed (self-released, 2010)
This Country is Torture (Bad Panda Records, 2011)
Robbery (self-released, 2013)

Bottleskup Flenkenkenmike
Untitled 12" (Toolbox, 2002)
Looks Like Velvet, Smells Like Pee (Broklyn Beats, 2002)

Some Became Hollow Tubes
In 1988 I Thought This Shit Would Never Change (self-released, 2019)
Keep it in the Ground (Gizeh Records, 2019)

References

External links
1-Speed Bike on MySpace
1-Speed Bike on Bandcamp
1-Speed Bike on Constellation Records
Some Became Hollow Tubes on Bandcamp

Year of birth missing (living people)
Living people
Place of birth missing (living people)
Canadian male drummers
Canadian electronic musicians
Godspeed You! Black Emperor members
Musicians from Montreal
Constellation Records (Canada) artists